The 2021 Motocross des Nations is a motocross race to be held on 25 and 26 September 2021 in Mantova, Italy.  The race usually takes place after the MXGP season, however because the 2021 GP schedule runs from April through November, the MXoN will take place in the middle of the MXGP series.

Entry list 
Start numbers will be allocated based on the team finishes from the 2019 competition. This will allocate number plates 1, 2 & 3 to the Netherlands (1st), 4, 5 & 6 to Belgium (2nd) and 7, 8 & 9 to the United Kingdom (3rd). The remainder of the top ten finishers were as follows: Estonia, France, United States, Germany, Latvia, Spain and Denmark.

The official entry list was published on 14 September.

The impacts of the COVID-19 pandemic that ultimately led to the cancellation of the 2020 event, meant that some of the sport's most important nations were unable to send a team. United States will miss their first MXdN since 2004, whilst Australia will be absent for the first time since 2002. Other nations absent who competed in 2019 included New Zealand, Japan, Puerto Rico, Cyprus and Luxembourg.

In addition to this, many of the sports top riders have decided to opt out of racing for their country due to the event's scheduling putting it in the middle of the 2021 world championship season. Tim Gajser (Slovenia), Romain Febvre & Maxime Renaux (France), Jorge Prado (Spain), Jeremy Seewer (Switzerland), Pauls Jonass (Latvia) and Jago Geerts (Belgium) all decided against competing, whilst Jeremy Van Horebeek (Belgium) withdrew from the event after initially being selected. He will be replaced by Cyril Genot.

Despite these challenges, the entry list features only one less nation than in 2019. A number of nations will return to the event after being absent in previous additions. Venezuela and Canada return for the first time since 2018. Former podium finishers Finland, as well as Slovakia, return for the first time since 2017, whilst Morocco will return to the event for only their third appearance - their last coming in 2015. Bulgaria are scheduled to compete for the first time ever in the event, the first debutant since Kuwait in 2011.

Russian athletes competed as a neutral competitors using the designation MFR (Motorcycle Federation of Russia), as the Court of Arbitration for Sport upheld a ban on Russia competing at World Championships. The ban was implemented by the World Anti-Doping Agency in response to state-sponsored doping program of Russian athletes.

Practice 
Practice is run on a class by class basis.

MXGP

MX2

Open

Qualifying Races 
Qualifying is run on a class by class basis.
Top 19 countries after qualifying go directly to the main Motocross des Nations races. The remaining countries go to a smaller final.
Best 2 scores count.

MXGP

MX2

Open

Qualification Standings 

 Qualified Nations

 Nations Admitted to the B-Final

B-Final 
The B-Final is for the nations who finished 20th-31st in qualifying. The top nation from the B-Final qualify for the Motocross des Nations races.
Best 2 scores for each nation counts.

Race

B-Final Standings 

 Finland qualify for the Motocross des Nations races.

Motocross des Nations races 
The main Motocross des Nations races consist of 3 races which combine two classes together in each. Lowest score wins with each nation allowed to drop their worst score after the final race.

MXGP+MX2

Nations standings after Race 1

MX2+Open

Nations standings after Race 2

MXGP+Open

Nations standings after Race 3

Final standings

References

2021
Motocross des Nations